The International 20:20 Club Championship was an international Twenty20 competition for club cricket teams. It was held once, hosted by Leicestershire County Cricket Club from 15 to 17 September 2005. It featured the winners of the domestic Twenty20 competitions from England, Pakistan and Sri Lanka, as well as the Leicestershire Foxes and the PCA Masters XI, a composition of current and past players of international cricket from around the world. The winners were awarded £25,000.

The competition was the first notable attempt at a competition featuring the top domestic Twenty20 teams from around the world. As Twenty20 cricket had only been introduced in 2003, the scale of the competition was limited. Australia, New Zealand and the West Indies were not represented due to their lack of a domestic Twenty20 competition. The competition had limited television coverage and three of the nine games could not proceed due to bad weather. While this competition was only held once, the creation of an international Twenty20 club tournament was executed successfully with the Champions League Twenty20 in 2009.

Teams
  Somerset Sabres (2005 Twenty20 Cup winners)
  Leicestershire Foxes (2004 Twenty20 Cup winners)
  Chilaw Marians (2004 Twenty20 Challenge Trophy winners)
  Faisalabad Wolves (2004–05 ABN-AMRO Twenty-20 Cup winners)
  Titans (2004–05 Standard Bank Pro20 Series winners)
 PCA Masters XI

Squads

 Leicestershire Foxes
 HD Ackerman (c)
 Paul Nixon (wk)
 James Allenby
 Stuart Broad
 Ottis Gibson
 Aftab Habib
 Darren Maddy
 David Masters
 John Maunders
 Dinesh Mongia
 John Sadler
 Jeremy Snape
 Charl Willoughby

 Chilaw Marians
 Hasantha Fernando (c)
 Ishan Mutaliph (wk)
 Charith Sylvester (wk)
 Manoj Chanaka
 Kalidu Fernando
 Malintha Gajanayake
 Janaka Gunaratne
 Dinuka Hettiarachchi
 Praneth Jayasundera
 Arosha Perera
 Dammika Perera
 Chinthaka Perera
 Nimesh Perera
 Dinuk Sulakshana
 Mahela Udawatte
 Gayan Wijekoon
 Omesh Wijesiriwardene

 Faisalabad Wolves
 Naved Latif (c)
 Mohammed Salman (wk)
 Abdul Mannan
 Ahmed Hayat
 Asif Hussain
 Faisal Afridi
 Ijaz Ahmed junior
 Imran Ali
 Imran Khalid
 Khurram Shehzad
 Mohammad Hafeez
 Mohammad Saleem
 Saeed Ajmal
 Samiullah Khan
 Shahid Muzaffar
 Tauqeer Hussain

 Titans
 Gerald Dros (c)
 Kruger van Wyk (wk)
 Maurice Aronstam
 Goolam Bodi
 Pierre de Bruyn
 Francois du Plessis
 Paul Harris
 Ethy Mbhalati
 Albie Morkel
 Morné Morkel
 Johannes Myburgh
 Alviro Petersen
 Aaron Phangiso
 Brendon Reddy
 Andre Seymore

PCA Masters XI
 Martyn Ball (c)
 Parthiv Patel (wk)
 Phil DeFreitas
 Rohan Gavaskar
 Chris Gayle
 Mark Hardinges
 Martin McCague
 Jon Lewis
 Nadeem Shahid
 Chris Schofield
 Robin Singh
 Craig Spearman
 Javagal Srinath

 Somerset Sabres
 Ian Blackwell (c)
 Carl Gazzard (wk)
 Sam Spurway (wk)
 Gareth Andrew
 Andy Caddick
 Wes Durston
 John Francis
 Simon Francis
 James Hildreth
 Keith Parsons
 Arul Suppiah
 Matthew Wood
 Robert Woodman

Fixtures

Group stage
Group A

Group B

Knockout stage

Semi-finals

Final

See also
 Champions League Twenty20
 Faisalabad Wolves

References

External links
Tournament site - CricInfo

International cricket competitions in 2005
2005 in English cricket
September 2005 sports events in the United Kingdom